Tết, short for , is the most important celebrations in Vietnamese culture. Tết celebrates the arrival of spring based on the Vietnamese calendar, which is mostly based on the lunisolar Chinese calendar and usually has the date in January or February in the Gregorian calendar.

 is not to be confused with Tết Trung Thu (Mid-Autumn Festival), which is also known as Children's Festival in Vietnam. "" itself only means festival but is often colloquially known as "Lunar New Year" in Vietnamese, as it is often seen as the most important festival amongst the Vietnamese and the Vietnamese diaspora, with  regarded as the second-most important.

Vietnamese people celebrate  annually, which is based on a lunisolar calendar (calculating both the motions of Earth around the Sun and of the Moon around Earth). Tết is generally celebrated on the same day as Chinese New Year (also called Spring Festival), with the one-hour time difference between Vietnam and China resulting in the new moon occurring on different days. Sometimes rarely, the dates of Vietnamese and Chinese Lunar New Year can differ as such in 1985, when Vietnam celebrated Lunar New Year, one month before China. It takes place from the first day of the first month of the Vietnamese lunar calendar (around late January or early February) until at least the third day.

Tết is also an occasion for pilgrims and family reunions. They set aside the trouble of the past year and hope for a better and happier upcoming year.

Name
The name Tết is a shortening of Tết Nguyên Đán, literally written as tết (meaning festivals; only used in festival names) and nguyên đán which means the first day of the year. Both words come from Sino-Vietnamese respectively, 節 (SV: tiết) and 元旦.

The word for festival is usually lễ hội, a Sino-Vietnamese word, 禮會.

Customs

 

Vietnamese people usually return to their families during Tết. Some return to worship at the family altar or visit the graves of their ancestors in their homeland. They also clear up the graves of their families as a sign of respect. Although Tết is a national holiday among all Vietnamese, each region and religion has its own customs.

Many Vietnamese prepare for Tết by cooking special holiday food and doing house cleaning. Many customs and traditions are practiced during Tết, such as visiting a person's house on the first day of the new year, ancestor worship, exchanging New Year's greetings, giving lucky money to children and elderly people, opening a shop, visiting relatives, friends, and neighbors.

Tết can be divided into three time periods, tất niên (celebrations before the end of the year), giao thừa (New Year's Eve), and năm mới (the New Year), representing the preparation before Tết, the eve of Tết, and the days of and following Tết, respectively.

The New Year in Tet

The first day of Tết is reserved for the nuclear family. Children receive red envelopes containing money from their elders. This tradition is called mừng tuổi (happy age) in the North region and lì xì in the South region. Usually, children wear their new clothes and give their elders the traditional Tết greetings before receiving money. Since the Vietnamese believe that the first visitor who a family receives in the year determines their fortune for the entire year, people never enter any house on the first day without being invited first. The verb of being the first person to enter a house at Tết is xông đất, xông nhà, or đạp đất, which is one of the most important customs during Tết. According to Vietnamese tradition, if good things come to a family on the first day of the lunar New Year, the entire following year will also be full of blessings. Usually, a person of good temper, morality, and success will be a lucky sign for the host family and be first invited into his house. However, just to be safe, the owner of the house will leave the house a few minutes before midnight and come back just as the clock strikes midnight to prevent anyone else from entering the house first who might potentially bring any unfortunate events in the new year, to the household.

Sweeping during Tết is taboo, it is xui or rủi (unlucky), since it symbolizes sweeping the luck away; that is why they clean before the new year. It is also taboo for anyone who experienced a recent loss of a family member to visit anyone else during Tết.

During subsequent days, people visit relatives and friends. Traditionally but not strictly, the second day of Tết is usually reserved for friends, while the third day is for teachers, who command respect in Vietnam. Local Buddhist temples are popular spots because people like to give donations and get their fortunes told during Tết. Children are free to spend their new money on toys or on gambling games such as bầu cua cá cọp, which can be found in the streets. Prosperous families can pay for dragon dancers to perform at their house. Also, public performances are given for everyone to watch.

Traditional celebrations
These celebrations can last from a day up to the entire week, and the New Year is filled with people in the streets trying to make as much noise as possible using firecrackers, drums, bells, gongs, and anything they can think of to ward off evil spirits. This parade will also include different masks and dancers hidden under the guise of what is known as the múa lân or lion dancing. The lân is an animal between a lion and a dragon and is the symbol of strength in the Vietnamese culture that is used to scare away evil spirits. After the parade, families, and friends come together to have a feast of traditional Vietnamese dishes and share the happiness and joy of the New Year with one another. This is also the time when the elders will hand out red envelopes with money to the children for good luck in exchange for Tết greetings.

It is also a tradition to pay off debts before the Vietnamese New Year for some Vietnamese families.

Decorations

The top end is usually decorated with many objects, depending on the locality, including good luck charms, origami fish, cactus branches, and more.

At Tết, every house is usually decorated by Yellow Apricot blossoms (hoa mai) in the central and southern parts of Vietnam, peach blossoms (hoa đào) in the northern part of Vietnam, or St. John's wort (hoa ban) in the mountain areas. In the north, some people (especially the elite in the past) also decorate their house with plum blossoms (also called hoa mơ in Vietnamese but referring to a totally different species from mickey-mouse blossoms). In the north or central, the kumquat tree is a popular decoration for the living room during Tết. Its many fruits symbolize fertility and fruitfulness which the family hopes in the coming year.

Vietnamese people also decorate their homes with bonsai and flowers such as chrysanthemums (hoa cúc), marigolds (vạn thọ) symbolizing longevity, cockscombs (mào gà) in southern Vietnam, and paperwhites (thủy tiên) and orchids (hoa lan) in northern Vietnam. In the past, there was a tradition where people tried to make their paperwhites bloom on the day of the observance.

They also hung up Đông Hồ paintings and thư pháp calligraphy pictures.

Greetings

The traditional greetings are "Chúc Mừng Năm Mới" (祝𢜠𢆥㵋, Happy New Year) and "Cung Chúc Tân Xuân", (恭祝新春, gracious wishes of the new spring). People also wish each other prosperity and luck. Common wishes for Tết include the following:

Sống lâu trăm tuổi: (𤯩𥹰𤾓歲, Live long for a hundred years!): used by children for elders. Traditionally, everyone is considered one year older on Tết, so children would wish their grandparents' health and longevity in exchange for mừng tuổi (𢜠歲) or lì xì (利市 "SV: lợi thị").
An khang thịnh vượng: (安康盛旺, Security, good health, and prosperity)
Vạn sự như ý: (萬事如意, May things go your way)
Sức khỏe dồi dào: (飭劸洡𤁠, Plenty of health!)
Làm ăn tấn tới: (爫咹晉𬧐, Be successful at work!)
Tiền vô như nước: (錢𠓺如渃, May money flow in like water!). Used informally.
Cung hỉ phát tài: (恭喜發財, Congratulations and best wishes for a prosperous New Year!)
Năm mới thắng lợi mới: (𢆥㵋勝利㵋, New year, new triumphs!; often heard in political speeches)
Chúc hay ăn chóng lớn: (祝𫨩咹𢶢𡘯, Eat well, grow quick!; aimed at children)
Năm mới thăng quan tiến chức: (𢆥㵋陞官進織, I wish for you to be promoted in the new year!)
Năm mới toàn gia bình an: (𢆥㵋全家平安, I wish that the new year will bring health and peace to your family!)
Mừng xuân Di-lặc: (𢜠春彌勒, Happy Spring of Maitreya!). Used by Buddhists.
Mừng xuân an lạc: (𢜠春安樂, Happy peaceful joyful spring!). Used by Buddhists.
Chúc mừng Chúa Xuân: (祝𢜠主春, Praise the Lord of Spring!). Used by Catholics.

Food

In the Vietnamese language, to celebrate Tết is to ăn Tết, literally meaning "eat Tết", showing the importance of food in its celebration. Some of the food is also eaten year-round, while other dishes are only eaten during Tết. Also, some of the food is vegetarian since it is believed to be good luck to eat vegetarian on Tết. Some traditional foods on Tết include the following:
 Bánh chưng and bánh tét: essentially tightly packed sticky rice with meat or bean fillings wrapped in dong leaves (Phrynium placentarium). When these leaves are unavailable, banana leaves can be used as a substitute. One difference between them is their shape. Bánh chưng is the square-shaped one to represent the Earth, while bánh tét is cylindrical to represent the moon. Also, bánh chưng is more popular in the northern parts of Vietnam, bánh tét is more popular in the south. Preparation can take days. After molding them into their respective shapes (the square shape is achieved using a wooden frame), they are boiled for several hours to cook.  The story of their origins and their connection with Tết is often recounted to children while cooking them overnight.
 Hạt dưa: roasted watermelon seeds, also eaten during Tết
 Dưa hành: pickled onion and pickled cabbage
 Củ kiệu: pickled small leeks
 Mứt: These dried candied fruits are rarely eaten at any time besides Tết.
 Kẹo dừa: coconut candy
 Kẹo mè xửng: peanut brittle with sesame seeds or peanuts
 Cầu sung dừa Đủ xoài: In southern Vietnam, popular fruits used for offerings at the family altar in fruit arranging art are the custard-apple/sugar-apple/soursop (mãng cầu), coconut (dừa), goolar fig (sung), papaya (đu đủ), and mango (xoài), since they sound like "cầu sung vừa đủ xài" ([We] pray for enough [money/resources/funds/goods/etc.] to use) in the southern dialect of Vietnamese.
 Thịt kho nước dừa Meaning "meat stewed in coconut juice", is a traditional dish of pork belly and medium boiled eggs stewed in a broth-like sauce made overnight of young coconut juice and nuoc mam. It is often eaten with pickled bean sprouts and chives, and white rice.
 Xôi gấc: a red sticky rice made from gac fruit, typically paired with chả lụa (the most common type of sausage in Vietnamese cuisine, made of pork and traditionally wrapped in banana leaves).

Forms of entertainment

People enjoy traditional games during Tết, including bầu cua cá cọp, cờ tướng, ném còn, chọi trâu, and đá gà. They also participate in some competitions presenting their knowledge, strength, and aestheticism, such as the bird competition and ngâm thơ competition.

Fireworks displays have also become a traditional part of a Tết celebration in Vietnam. During New Year's Eve, fireworks displays at major cities, such as Hanoi, Ho Chi Minh City, and Da Nang, are broadcast through multiple national and local TV channels, accompanied by New Year wishes of the incumbent president. In 2017 only, fireworks displays were prohibited due to political and financial reasons. In 2021, due to the COVID-19 pandemic, most provinces and cities canceled the fireworks displays; instead, the displays were only held in Hà Nội and several provinces with public gatherings prohibited. In 2022, due to the aforementioned pandemic, all provinces canceled the firework displays due to financial reasons. In Australia, Canada & the United States, there are fireworks displays at many of its festivals, although in 2021 they were either held virtually or canceled.

Gặp nhau cuối năm ("Year-end meet") is a nationally known satirical theatrical comedy show, broadcast on VTV on New Year's Eve.

Dates in the Vietnamese calendar

From 1996 to 2067.

Music
In the weeks leading up to Tet, celebratory songs are played throughout Vietnam. One song, Ngày Tết Quê Em (Tet in My Homeland) was released by  Linh Trang and Xuan Mai in 2006. It was on the album Xuân Mai và Thiếu Nhi Cali 2 Hội chợ Cali. The song can be heard playing in many public places across the country.

The lyrics to this song in Vietnamese are: 

Tết Tết Tết Tết đến rồi

Tết Tết Tết Tết đến rồi

Tết Tết Tết Tết đến rồi

Tết đến trong tim mọi người

Mừng ngày Tết trên khắp quê tôi

Ngàn hoa thơm khoa sắc xinh tươi

Đàn em thơ khoe áo mới

Chạy tung tăng vui pháo hoa

Mừng ngày Tết trên khắp quê tôi

Người ra Trung, ra Bắc, vô Nam

Dù đi đâu ai cũng nhớ

Về chung vui bên gia đình

Tết Tết Tết Tết đến rồi

Tết Tết Tết Tết đến rồi

Tết Tết Tết Tết đến rồi

Tết đến trong tim mọi người

Mừng ngày Tết phố xá đông vui

Người đi thăm, đi viếng, đi chơi

Người lo đi mua sắm Tết

Người dâng hương đi lễ chùa

Mừng ngày Tết ta chúc cho nhau

Một năm thêm sung túc an vui

Người nông dân thêm lúa thóc

Người thương gia mau phát tài

Tết Tết Tết Tết đến rồi

Tết Tết Tết Tết đến rồi

Tết Tết Tết Tết đến rồi

Tết đến trong tim mọi người

Several covers of the song have been produced since its initial release. An English version was released by  Khánh Vy and Thảo Tâm in 2020. 

The lyrics to the English version are: 

Tet Tet Tet is coming

Tet Tet Tet is coming

Tet Tet Tet is coming

Tet has come to our hearts.

Tet Tet Tet is coming

Tet Tet Tet is coming

Tet Tet Tet is coming

Tet has come to our hearts.

Happy holiday everywhere

Flowers blooming in the air

Little children dressing up

Run around with fireworks.

Happy Holiday in everywhere

People traveling here and there

We go far, we go long

But Tet is the time we go home.

Tet Tet Tet is coming

Tet Tet Tet is coming

Tet Tet Tet is coming

Tet has come to our hearts.

Tet Tet Tet is coming

Tet Tet Tet is coming

Tet Tet Tet is coming

Tet has come to our hearts.

Everybody’s happy in towns

Some will meet up and hang out

Some go shopping together

Some pray in pagodas. 

Happy Tet I wish for you

A fortune, happy, peaceful year

If you’re farmer, you’ll gain more

If you’re dealers, you’ll earn more.

The song summarizes some of the main Tet traditions. During Tet, it is traditional for Vietnamese people to travel to their hometowns, hence the lyrics “People traveling here and there.” 

Typically, there are large fireworks displays in most major cities. Prior to 1995, it was customary to use firecrackers at individual homes; however, the government banned the production and use of these fireworks due to fatal accidents. In December 2020 a regulation was passed that allows “anyone aged 18 and older with legal capacity” to purchase sparklers for special occasions. The regulations went into effect on January 11, 2020.

While the song is not inherently religious, it does reference pagodas, a tiered tower used by Buddhists and Taoists for worship. Many Buddhist altars are set up in the weeks leading up to Tet. 

The line “If you’re a farmer, you’ll gain more” refers to beliefs held by many Vietnamese people about the effects the new year will bring on agriculture. Tet symbolizes the start of the spring season. Farmers traditionally use this time as an opportunity to remember the gods of harvest.  The next line, “If you’re dealers, you’ll earn more” refers to the amount of work retailers do in order to be prepared for the surge of shopping in preparation for the holiday.

See also
List of Buddhist festivals
Celebrations of the Lunar New Year in other parts of Asia:
 Chinese New Year (Spring Festival)
 Korean New Year (Seollal)
 Japanese New Year (Shōgatsu)
 Mongolian New Year (Tsagaan Sar)
 Tibetan New Year (Losar)
Similar Asian Lunisolar New Year celebrations that occur in April:
Burmese New Year (Thingyan)
Cambodian New Year (Chaul Chnam Thmey)
Lao New Year (Pii Mai)
Bengali New Year (Pahela Baisakh)
Sri Lankan New Year (Aluth Avuruddu)
Thai New Year (Songkran)

References

External links

 Tet Nguyen Dan: The Vietnamese New Year - Queens Botanical Garden
 Vietnamese New Year customs
 Tet Holiday
 Vietnamese calendar rules - Hồ Ngọc Đức, Leipzig University.
 Tết - Vietnamese Lunar New Year Traditions 
 Tet Festival Orange County Fairgrounds, Costa Mesa, CA
 Tet on Phu Quoc Island on Vietnam's largest island
 Tết Festival - San Francisco
 Vietnamese New Year – Learn about the traditions and customs of the Tet Holiday

New Year celebrations
Public holidays in Vietnam
Festivals in Vietnam
Buddhist holidays
Vietnamese words and phrases
January observances
February observances
Observances honoring the dead
Observances set by the Vietnamese calendar
Buddhist festivals in Vietnam
Observances held on the new moon